Solomon Blatt may refer to:

Solomon Blatt Sr. (1895–1986), Speaker of the South Carolina House of Representatives
Solomon Blatt Jr. (1921–2016), United States federal judge in South Carolina